"Healer" is the first segment of the third episode of the first season (1985–86) of the television series The Twilight Zone. In this segment, a small-time crook acquires a stone that gives him miraculous healing powers.

Plot
Cat burglar Jackie Thompson breaks into a museum and steals a stone from a display case. After tripping the alarm, he is shot by a security guard, but the stolen stone heals him. Jack escapes and heads back to his apartment. Hearing a commotion in the hallway, he discovers that his friendly neighbor Harry is having a heart attack. While grasping the stone, Jackie touches Harry's chest and begs for healing. Harry makes a full recovery.

Harry tells Jackie he had an out of body experience, which he feels confirms that the stone not only healed him, but brought him back from the dead. Harry tells Jackie that they could make a fortune with that kind of power. Jackie becomes "Brother John," a healer on a TV ministry. Jackie is so heartened by the good he accomplishes that he comes to care about it more than the money, while Harry remains only interested in profits. Duende, a Native American man, visits them backstage and states that his people loaned the stone to the museum. He demands they give it back. Jackie is inclined to return the stone, since they have already earned more money than they can spend in a lifetime and he fears Duende will report his theft to the police otherwise, but Harry refuses.

Joseph Rubello, a drug lord, visits Jackie at his home and begs him to heal his terminal cancer. Because Rubello once had his thugs put Jackie in the hospital for botching a delivery, Jackie demands $2 million to heal him. However, the stone fails to work. Hoping this was a one-time failure, at the TV ministry Jackie tests the power by trying to heal a deaf boy backstage, so as not to risk embarrassing himself on live television. The power fails again. Duende arrives and explains that the stone only works when used unselfishly. His old bullet wound opens and begins bleeding profusely. Harry refuses to help Jackie, preferring to inherit his half of the profits. The deaf boy follows Jackie outside. He hands the stone to the boy, who heals him. Jackie takes the stone and cures the boy's deafness. He then gives the stone back to Duende. Jackie's TV career is over, but he has a brighter outlook on life now that he has learned to care about other people.

External links
 

1985 American television episodes
The Twilight Zone (1985 TV series season 1) episodes

fr:Le Guérisseur (La Cinquième Dimension)